Cheon Eun-bi (천은비, born 7 February 1992) is a South Korean field hockey player.  She was part of the Korea women's national field hockey team in the women's hockey tournament at the 2012 and 2016 Summer Olympics.

She won a gold medal as a member of the South Korean team at 2014 Asian Games.

References

External links
 

1992 births
Living people
South Korean female field hockey players
Asian Games medalists in field hockey
Asian Games gold medalists for South Korea
Field hockey players at the 2012 Summer Olympics
Field hockey players at the 2014 Asian Games
Field hockey players at the 2016 Summer Olympics
Medalists at the 2014 Asian Games
Olympic field hockey players of South Korea
20th-century South Korean women
21st-century South Korean women